Onnia tomentosa is a species of fungus in the family Hymenochaetaceae commonly known as the woolly velvet polypore. It is frequently found in coniferous forests at higher altitudes, often growing in large groups, rather rare at lower altitudes. It is a plant pathogen, and causes tomentosus root rot, primarily in spruce. It was formerly known as Inonotus tomentosum (Fr.) Teng until molecular phylogenetic analysis led to major revisions in the classification of the Hymenochaetaceae.

Description

The cap is flat when young, with a blunt, rounded and yellowish-white margin, later with a slightly depressed centre and contoured in a wave pattern towards the rim,
which has a rather sharp edge when old. The stem, if present, is short and thick, and dark brown to near-black; the caps may also grow directly on the base of a tree. The flesh is ochre brown under the cap surface, softer above, and hard and fibrous below. The species is inedible.

Most commercially important conifers in Canada, including white spruce, are attacked by Inonotus tomentosus (Fr.) Teng also known as Onnia tomentosa. This fungus produces a white pocket rot commonly called Tomentosus root rot in both roots and butts of naturally seeded or planted conifers. White spruce and black spruce were found to be the two most susceptible species in an inoculation test in Saskatchewan, and high losses to root rot, in large part due to I. tomentosus, affected white spruce plantations at Grand-Mère QC. In white spruce plantations, mortality in groups of two or three trees usually occurs at about the age of 30–35 years, but younger trees can also be killed. Occasional trees as young as 10 years of age are infected. Seventeen white spruce plantations 43–58 years old in Ontario incurred an average of 0.7% mortality annually over a 6-year study period. Average accumulated mortality of dominant and codominant trees was 10.3% for all plantations in that study. Tomentosus root rot was found in more than half the stumps after clearcutting in a plantation at Searchmont, Ontario, but decay and stain had not yet reached stump height.

Similar species 
Coltricia perennis is similar, but has a weakly circularly zoned, bare cap. The flesh of the cap is stained uniformly. Other species of Coltricia and Phaeolus are also similar.

References

Further reading 
 E. Garnweidner. Mushrooms and Toadstools of Britain and Europe. Collins. 1994.

Fungal tree pathogens and diseases
Fungi described in 1821
Fungi of North America
Hymenochaetaceae
Inedible fungi
Taxa named by Elias Magnus Fries